Hugo Koivuniemi (28 December 1894 – 25 May 1963) was a Finnish diver. He competed in the men's plain high diving event at the 1924 Summer Olympics.

References

External links
 

1894 births
1963 deaths
Finnish male divers
Olympic divers of Finland
Divers at the 1924 Summer Olympics
Sportspeople from Vyborg